Oggar, the World's Mightiest Immortal, is a fictional character from the publisher Fawcett Comics, whose publication rights were acquired by DC Comics in the 1970s. Oggar was a villain of Captain Marvel chronology in Pre-Crisis; he made no Post-Crisis appearances. He first appeared in Captain Marvel Adventures # 61 (May 1946, Fawcett Comics). His first appearance in DC Comics was in World's Finest Comics # 264 (August 1980).

He was a major recurring enemy of the Marvels in the DC Comics stories published before the continuity-resetting Crisis on Infinite Earths miniseries in 1985.

Development
In a 1974 interview, writer Otto Binder admitted, "The Oggar serial was really a flop, to be frank. It was again one of my ideas and it seemed to be great in my mind, but when it came to writing and developing the theme, it just sort of went nowhere and it was quickly killed after six chapters. That was how it worked: For every good idea, there were a couple of so-so ones."

Fictional character biography
Originally, the Wizard Shazam was called Shazamo. He was a powerful wizard and led a pantheon of heroes whose initials formed its name: Solomon, Hercules, Atlas, Zeus, Achilles, Mercury ... and Oggar. However, power corrupted Oggar, who was a former pupil of Shazamo. At one point, Oggar refused an order from Shazamo to help a small nation that was being invaded by a tyrant. Oggar stated that Shazamo was getting old and that Oggar himself should lead the pantheon. After engaging in combat with Shazamo, he could not counter the wizard's power. Shazamo consequently condemned Oggar to live among mortals and subsequently removed the "O" from his name. Before leaving, Oggar remained close enough to the gates of the Shazamo temple that he heard a prophecy: In the twentieth century, the wizard (now Shazam) would die and would have a successor named Billy Batson. Billy was destined to become Captain Marvel and acquire the combined powers of the remaining heroes of the pantheon. Oggar thought it would be wise to wait until the twentieth century when there would only be Captain Marvel rather than seven enemies to defeat. However, 3000 years ago in the mortal world, Oggar tried to seduce the beautiful Circe to be his queen while attempting to conquer the world, but she refused (Note: This is Earth-S Circe; yet she resembles the mythological figure but is not the same Circe from the actual DC Universe). Oggar tried to avenge himself, but his magic was unable to harm women. So instead he gave her a gift by making her immortal. However, the spell did nothing to mitigate the effects of aging and after about 200 years she was still alive but terribly ugly and wrinkled. She eventually developed a mortal hatred of all men who were now horrified by her face. She learned witchcraft and how to turn men into animals. After his rebellion, the wizard Shazam cursed Oggar with cloven hooves.

Oggar returned in the 20th Century and battled Captain Marvel as he tried to recruit people to the Cult of the Curse. If they left, they were driven mad. However, he finally encountered Circe, who turned him into a boar. In this form, he fell off of a precipice and died.

However, he was able to reform himself with his magic due to the help of Mr. Mind and joined the Monster Society of Evil. He and Black Adam went to conquer Egypt. With his magic he turned Billy mute, then summoned up an army from the sand for Black Adam to lead. However Mary Marvel was able to trick him into striking Billy with lightning, after which the two Marvels defeat the army. Oggar and the rest of the Society attack the Rock of Eternity, forcing the entire Marvel Family to fight them. Mary disguises herself as her brother and gets close enough to Oggar to bind and gag him.

Powers and abilities
Oggar has divine strength and durability equal to Captain Marvel's. He possesses vast magical powers that enable him to do nearly anything, like fly, create objects, teleport himself and others, make people burst into flames, create a large fissure in the ground, create an invisible, indestructible force field, mute people, shoot lightning bolts out of his finger, or summon a magic lightning bolt to change Captain Marvel back into Billy Batson, although each spell could only be used once against the same person. 

Oggar's power cannot be used to directly harm a female target, which makes Mary Marvel the preferred member of the Marvel Family to deal with him (however, Oggar has repeatedly worked around this limitation; one time by giving immortality to Circe without giving her eternal youth, and another time by directing magical lightning to strike the ground where Mary Marvel was standing). 

By kicking someone in their forehead with one of his cloven hooves, Oggar can brand them with the mark of his cult of the curse: a hoof print on their forehead. The person then must obey Oggar’s every command, or the hoof print vanishes and they become struck by a curse that turns them insane. However, if the person is already insane, the curse cures their insanity instead. Oggar is also immortal, and cannot age. However, he is vulnerable to magical transformation spells.

References

Characters created by Bill Parker (comics)
Characters created by C. C. Beck
Characters created by Otto Binder
Comics characters introduced in 1946
DC Comics characters with superhuman strength
DC Comics supervillains
Fawcett Comics supervillains
DC Comics characters who use magic
DC Comics characters who can teleport 
Golden Age supervillains
Fictional characters with immortality
Fictional characters with electric or magnetic abilities
Fictional characters with fire or heat abilities
Captain Marvel (DC Comics)